Vijaypur Jammu railway station is a small railway station in Samba district, Jammu and Kashmir. Its code is VJPJ. It serves Vijaypur city. The station consists of two platforms. The platform is not well sheltered. It lacks many facilities including water and sanitation.

Major trains 

 Jhelum Express
 Kolkata–Jammu Tawi Express
 Pathankot–Jammu Tawi DEMU Special
 Jammu Mail
 Pathankot Jn–Udhampur DMU
 Tatanagar–Jammu Tawi Express
 Jammu Tawi–Bathinda Express
 Ahmedabad–Jammu Tawi Express

References

Railway stations in Samba district
Firozpur railway division
Transport in Jammu